Pago Casa del Blanco is a Spanish winery in Castilla–La Mancha, Spain. The winery uses the Vino de Pago wine appellation, a classification for Spanish wine applied to individual vineyards or wine estates, unlike the Denominación de Origen Protegida (DOP) or Denominación de Origen Calificada (DOCa) which is applied to an entire wine region. The Pago Casa del Blanco winery was formed as a Vino de Pago in 2003, and geographically it lies within the extent of the La Mancha DOP. The winery in fact sells wine under the Vino de Pago appellation as Pago Casa del Blanco, and under the I.G.P. "Vino de la Tierra de Castilla" appellation.

References

External links

Wine regions of Spain
Spanish wine
Appellations
Wine classification